The Special Anti-Terrorist Unit is the police tactical unit of the Serbian Police.

History
The Special Police Force of the Republican Secretary for the Interior of the Socialist Republic of Serbia was established on 18 December 1978. The first base for the Milicija unit was at the Milicija Station in New Belgrade. Its first commander was Miloš Bujenović. 

In 1983, the unit moved to Belgrade Airport in Surčin. In 1991, the Ministry of Internal Affairs (MUP) was established with the unit renamed as the Anti-Terrorism Unit. In 1992, the Anti-Terrorism Unit was placed under the Public Security Service (RJB) which oversaw the Milicija in the new Republic of Serbia. A command was founded in 1992 in the RJB; besides Belgrade, it established branches in Novi Sad and Priština. Zoran Simović was the head of the then Belgrade unit, Novi Sad was led by Branko Jurčić, and Pristina Radoslav Stalević. During the war in 1992, the unit moved to the first dedicated base in which it is still today near Batajnica, called Training Center "13 May".

In 1994, the unit was renamed as the Special Anti-Terrorist Unit, which it bears to the current day. In 1996, the Milicija was renamed to Policija (Police). During 1998 and 1999 Kosovo War, the unit operated on the suppression of militants of the KLA in the territory of Kosovo and Metohija. During these operations, sixteen members of the unit died in combat. The Special Anti-Terrorist Unit was commanded by: Radovan Stojčić, Miodrag Tepavčević, Živko Trajković and Milovan Glišović.

In 2005, the SAJ commander became Spasoje Vulević (the first Serbian policeman who completed the U.S. FBI Academy). From 1978 to 2008, around 650 members passed through SAJ. The Serbian Police had two police tactical units under the command of the Police Directorate of the Police: the SAJ and the Counter-Terrorist Unit (PTJ) which had been established in 2003. In 2015, it was announced that the two units were to be unified with the name SAJ retained as it had a longer history with Spasoje Vulević to be the appointed as commander of the unit which would continue to use both SAJ and PTJ training facilities. Only the elite members of the SAJ and PTJ were to be accepted into the new unit with members failing the standard redeployed elsewhere in the police or retired. In December 2018, the Special Anti-Terrorist Unit celebrated its 40-years anniversary.

Structure
SAJ has four teams: "A", "B", "C" and "D". The "first fist" is represented by teams "A" and "B" that solve complicated hostile situations, dropping in jets, buses, breaking into barred objects, arresting dangerous and armed persons and criminals. Team C is specialized and consists of: Sniper Group, Diving Group, Dog Training Group, Mine Explosive Substances and Biological and Chemical Products (BHS). 
When performing tasks "A", "B" and "C", the team acts coordinated, as a single entity, a team in which each has precise tasks. The "D" team provides important personalities and facilities that are threatened by the immediate threat of a terrorist attack and provide fire support. The logistical support is provided by the Medical Group, the Group for the Construction and Testing of Arms and Ammunition, the Technical and Emergency Service.

Equipment

Gallery

In popular culture
SAJ appears in a video games Call of Duty: Modern Warfare (2019 video game) and Call of Duty: Mobile

References

External links

Videos

Other
 Ministry of Internal Affairs
 Special Anti-Terrorist Unit 
 Photos

SAJ
SAJ
Non-military counterterrorist organizations
Articles containing video clips
Specialist law enforcement agencies of Serbia